ISON is the debut studio album by Iranian-Dutch singer Sevdaliza. It was released on 26 April 2017 by Twisted Elegance. The album is named after Comet ISON, a sungrazing comet. It includes two songs from Sevdaliza's second extended play, Children of Silk (2015), "Amandine Insensible" and "Marilyn Monroe", the latter of which was released as the album's fourth single on 14 April 2017. "Human" was released as the lead single on 17 November 2016, which was followed by "Hero" as the second single on 4 April 2017 and "Hubris" as the third single on 12 April.

According to Sarah Sitkin, who designed the cover art, the cover depicts Sevdaliza as the mother to herself, to her past lives, and to the album's 16 songs. On 21 November 2017, ISON was reissued digitally with the bonus track "Hear My Pain Heal", for which an accompanying music video premiered on the same day.

Composition
PopMatters viewed the album as "a headfirst dive into the downtempo," noting elements of trip hop, "smokey jazz," and "styles too unique to name before ending with." Pitchfork described ISON as "a modern-day trip hop album built on minimal breakbeats and heavy layers of orchestration," while stating Sevdaliza "switches between the stately inflection of a classic jazz singer backed by strings and the brassy nerve of a digital-age R&B artist flexing and cooing over the beat." NPR Music wrote that the album navigates "trip-hop, industrial R&B and a strain of dubstep that's more soul than shuffle." The Fader stated the album consists of "16 trip-hop inflected tracks." SLUG Magazine commented that the album "has stuck closely to her previous work of trip-hop/electronic EP releases," while comparing certain tracks to those of Radiohead and Beyoncé.

GIGsoup stated: "The music Sevdaliza creates has repeatedly been likened to 'alternative R&B' artists such as FKA Twigs and Kelela, and while not entirely unfair, such comparisons only tell part of the story. There's certainly no shortage of industrial-flavoured electronics to be found on ISON, however, these are also combined with trip hop beats, orchestral arrangements, subtle keys, stunningly agile vocals and deeply reflective lyrics, all of which are woven together into a rich and detailed tapestry", adding that "while similarities with the work of FKA Twigs and Kelela can be found on the likes of 'Hero' and 'Human', it's the influence of Portishead which looms largest over the album." They also mentioned that the influence of Björk is notable within the orchestral arrangements, which gives "a subtle hint" of her 1997 album, Homogenic.

Track listing

Personnel
Credits adapted from the liner notes of ISON.

 Sevdaliza – vocals ; production ; arrangement ; additional keyboards ; drum programming ; executive production
 Joel Dieleman – additional keyboards ; synthesiser 
 Leon Den Engelsen – additional keyboards 
 Mucky – production ; mastering, mixing ; drum programming ; arrangement ; recording ; synthesiser ; executive production
 Tokio Myers – additional keyboards 
 Mihai Puscoiu – strings ; recording ; additional strings

Charts

Release history

References

2017 albums
Sevdaliza albums